Der Wallersee is a lake in the Austrian state of Salzburg northeast of the city oft Salzburg in Salzburg-Umgebung District.

Around the lake there is a hiking path of about  length; at its southern part, it converges with the famous Camino de Santiago (Austrian route). There are two campsite resorts. It is allowed to swim and bath. 

The northern shore consists of bogland since 1883 and is called Wenger Moor.

Populated places adjacent to the lake
 Henndorf am Wallersee south of the lake
 Köstendorf north
 Neumarkt am Wallersee east
 Seekirchen am Wallersee west

References

External links 

 Seenland Tourismus GmbH 
 www.wallersee.info (tourism site) 
 Geografische Informationen zum Wallersee Salzburger Landesregierung 

Lakes of Salzburg (state)
Salzach basin